The National Emergency Management Agency is an agency in Nigeria. The agency focuses on disaster management in all parts of the country. The agency was established in 1999, and functions to formulate policies relating to disaster management in Nigeria. 

Director generals included: 

 Muhammad Sani-Sidi 
Abbas Idriss 

The agency coordinates with state-level emergency agencies called States’ Emergency Management Agencies, such as the Edo State Emergency Management Agency. These agencies were authorized by the NEMA act which created the national service. As of 2011, 26 of the 36 states of Nigeria had state level agencies.

FUNCTIONS OF NEMA 
The NEMA  Act vested the power of overseeing fiascos in Nigeria NEMA. As indicated by the empowering regulation; the Organization will among different things,

(a) Figure out strategy on movements of every sort connecting with the catastrophe the executives in Nigeria and co-ordinate the plans and projects for productive and impact reaction to fiascos at public level;

(b) Screen the condition of readiness of all.

FACILITIES AND INFRASTUCTURES NEMA ADOPTS FOR COORDINATING DISASTER MANAGEMENT 
Mission Control Centre (MCC)

The mission Control Center is situated in the Central command of NEMA which is a computer structure satellite innovation that utilizes the COSPAS-SARSAT tech framework/facility. The framework is intended to pick trouble cautions and area information to aid Search and Salvage Activity, utilizing rocket and ground offices to recognize and find the signs of misery reference points working on 406 MHz. At the point when there is a trouble alert from the guide situated on a boat or airplane, the satellite framework communicates the sign to the ground fragment offices from where the information is handled and sent to the fitting Mission Control Center (MCC).

Geographic Information System (GIS)

NEMA laid out a useful Geography Information System lab for early advance notice and accuracy in light of the administration. The lab gathers spatial information, analyse them and plans valuable data that assists with helping reactions to problems. It is one of the huge offices of the organization for its debacle risk decrease program.

Mobile clinics

Time is a vital component in solving problems of the board. In acknowledgment of this, the organization acquired endorsement and obtained offices for versatile facilities that have been decisively positioned in Abuja, Kaduna, Lagos and Port Harcourt to be conveyed in case of any serious debacle. While game plans are on to secure a greater amount of the facilities, the organization has likewise obtained a lot of ambulances positioned in Abuja and every one of the six zonal workplaces.

References 

Emergency organizations
Emergency services in Nigeria
Government agencies of Nigeria
Government agencies established in 1999
1999 establishments in Nigeria